The 1965 Davis Cup was the 54th edition of the Davis Cup, the most important tournament between national teams in men's tennis. 31 teams entered the Europe Zone, 9 teams entered the Eastern Zone, and 5 teams entered the America Zone.

The United States defeated Mexico in the America Zone final, India defeated Japan in the Eastern Inter-Zonal final, and Spain defeated South Africa in the Europe Zone final. In the Inter-Zonal Zone, Spain defeated the United States in the semifinal, and then defeated India in the final. Spain were then defeated by the defending champions Australia in the Challenge Round. The final was played at White City Stadium in Sydney, Australia on 27–29 December.

America Zone

Draw

Final
United States vs. Mexico

Eastern Zone

Zone A

Zone B

Eastern Inter-Zonal Final
Japan vs. India

Europe Zone

Draw

Final
Spain vs. South Africa

Inter-Zonal Zone

Draw

Semifinals
Spain vs. United States

Final
Spain vs. India

Challenge Round
Australia vs. Spain

References

External links
Davis Cup Official Website

 
Davis Cups by year
Davis Cup
Davis Cup
Davis Cup
Davis Cup
Davis Cup